Fuxing Road may refer to:

Fuxing Road, Beijing, road in Beijing, China
Fuxing Road (Taipei), road in Taipei, Taiwan